Babirah is a village located in the Tel Kaif District of the Ninawa Governorate in northern Iraq. The village is located ca.  southwest of Telskuf in the Nineveh Plains. It belongs to the disputed territories of Northern Iraq.

Babirah is populated by Yazidis.

History 
The village was originally an Assyrian village known as Bet Bore before it was settled by Yazidis and was known to contain an Assyrian population up until at least the 13th century.

References 

Populated places in Nineveh Governorate
Yazidi populated places in Iraq
Historic Assyrian communities in Iraq